Baures Municipality is a municipality of the Beni Department, Bolivia.

References 

 Instituto Nacional de Estadistica de Bolivia

Municipalities of Beni Department